The Centre International de Mathématiques Pures et Appliquées (CIMPA; English: International Centre for Pure and Applied Mathematics) is a category 2 UNESCO centre based in Nice with the mission to promote research in mathematics in developing countries. CIMPA is an association under the 1901 French law on associations and is funded by government agencies in France, Norway, Spain, and Switzerland.

History
Following a recommendation made during the 18th session of the General Conference of UNESCO in Paris in 1974, the creation of CIMPA was decided during the 19th session of the General Conference of UNESCO in Nairobi in 1976.  On the initiative of the French Government and a group of founding members (J.P. Aubin, J. Céa, P. Deheuvels, F. Dress, C. Godbillon, H. Hogbe Nlend, J.L. Lions, J.L. Koszul, E.J. Picard, A. Revuz, P. Sabourin), the International Center for Pure and Applied Mathematics was formally created as an association of the law of 1901, on 30 October 1978. According to its statutes, its mission is the training of mathematicians coming in priority from developing countries, by means of study visits during the university academic year and of summer schools, and with the help of the development of means of documentations. The seat of CIMPA is fixed at Nice, and its host university is the University of Nice Sophia Antipolis.

Activities
The organization of about 20 research schools per year in developing countries constitutes the main activity of CIMPA.  This is supplemented by other kinds of actions such as the research training schools in partnership with learned societies like the African Mathematical Union (AMU), the Mathematical Union of Latin America and the Caribbeans (UMALCA in Spanish), the South East Asian Mathematical Society (SEAMS) or the Southern Africa Mathematical Sciences Association (SAMSA).  CIMPA works equally in partnership with other organizations with similar aims such as the International Mathematical Union (IMU) or the Abdus Salam International Centre for Theoretical Physics (ICTP).

Funding
The principal financial support of CIMPA comes from the French Ministry of Higher Education, Research and Innovation (MESR), the University of Nice Sophia Antipolis, the laboratory of excellence CARMIN (Centre for international mathematical encounters), and the National Institute of Mathematical Sciences and their interactions (INSMI) of the Centre National de la Recherche Scientifique (CNRS).  Since 2009, CIMPA has also been supported by the Ministry of Economics and Business (MINECO, Spain). Since 2011, CIMPA has additionally been supported by the Ministry of Education and Research (Norway) and by a grant from Switzerland via the University of Neuchâtel.

Presidents
 1978: Jean Céa
 1979–1988: Henri Hogbe Nlend
 1989–1992: François Dress
 1993–1996: Attia Ashour
 1997–2000: Roger Ballay
 2001–2004: Mohamed Jaoua
 2005–2008: Mario Wschebor
 2009-2016: Tsou Sheung Tsun
 Since January 2017: Barry Green

Executive directors
 1979–1984: Pierre Grisvard
 1985: Solange Delache
 1986–1991: Jean-Michel Lemaire
 1992–1994: Georges Dloussky
 1994: Jean Pouget
 1995–2000: Claude Lobry
 2000–2008: Michel Jambu
 2008-2016: Claude Cibils
 Since September 2016: Ludovic Rifford

External links 
 Website of CIMPA
 Website of AMU
 Website of UMALCA
 Website of SEAMS
 Website of SAMSA
 Website of IMU
 Website of ICTP

Mathematics organizations
Education in France